Jonnie Liteat Kuper was the second Bishop of Hanuato'o: he was consecrated and installed on 10 April 2005; and became vicar general for the Diocese of Central Melanesia.

References

Living people
21st-century Anglican bishops in Oceania
Anglican bishops of Hanuato'o
Year of birth missing (living people)